The Lotrișor is a right tributary of the river Olt in Romania. It discharges into the Olt north of Călimănești. It flows through the Cozia National Park.

References

Rivers of Romania
Rivers of Vâlcea County